George Webb Yantz (July 27, 1886 to February 26, 1967) was a professional baseball player. Yantz played in one game as a catcher in Major League Baseball, going 1 for 1 for the Chicago Cubs in 1912 season. Overall, he played ten seasons professionally, from 1907 until 1916. Yantz was born and died in Louisville, Kentucky.

External links

Baseball-Almanac page

Major League Baseball catchers
Chicago Cubs players
Grand Rapids Wolverines players
Lawrenceburg (minor league baseball) players
Frankfort Statesmen players
San Antonio Bronchos players
Birmingham Barons players
New Orleans Pelicans (baseball) players
Portland Beavers players
Lincoln Tigers players
Evansville Evas players
Baseball players from Louisville, Kentucky
1886 births
1967 deaths